Ota Airport was the planned site for the new Lisbon airport located in Ota,  north of Lisbon, the capital of Portugal, from the late 1990s until January 2008 when the project was aborted.

Description
The area where the future airport was to be built is occupied by a former air base of the Portuguese Air Force. The permanent air operations of this facility were discontinued, but it is still used as a military and technical training center.

There was already a small airstrip at Ota but that was to be removed prior to construction. Completion of the airport was projected around 2017. The airport would have had two runways on the borders of the airport property and would have been able to accommodate the Boeing 747 and perhaps the Airbus A380. Ota Airport would likely have served the airlines and their destinations that currently serve Lisbon Portela Airport. The deadline for a final decision was set by the Government as December 2007.

Decision
The decision process has been qualified as a typical analysis paralysis.
According to final governmental decision, the  OTA location was turned down in favour of Alcochete Airport, an area used currently for Portuguese Air Force exercises. The location is closer to Lisbon centre and to the Centre of mass of the Lisbon metropolitan area, with future expansions guaranteed. Planes can land and take off from different directions. Also, the site is already state property.

Transportation
The proposed Portuguese TGV high speed train would have a stop at Ota with connections to the rest of the country.

As the decision is instead in Alcochete, the Vasco da Gama bridge will be the main road connection, while a ferry boat and a nearby third crossing on the Tagus River would also serve the airport.

Controversy and Public Opinion
The decision process has been controversial, with defenders of the various offers arguing with all sorts of facts and visions. Local lobbying is also strong. According to polls as at November 2007, public preference is clear for Alcochete (63%) vs Ota (15%).
But still lacks an environmental impact study to confirm that Alcochete is indeed the best place to build a large infrastructure like an airport, and that same environmental impact study could overturn that decision over to Ota again.

References 

Airports in Portugal